The 1996 All Japan Grand Touring Car Championship was the fourth season of Japan Automobile Federation GT premiere racing. It was marked as well as the fourteenth season of a JAF-sanctioned sports car racing championship dating back to the All Japan Sports Prototype Championship. The GT500 class champion was the #61 Team Lark McLaren F1 GTR driven by David Brabham and John Nielsen, and the GT300 class champion was the #26 Team Taisan Jr Porsche 964 driven by Keiichi Suzuki and Morio Nitta.

For the 1996 season, the names of the two classes of the JGTC were changed to GT500 and GT300, replacing the previous GT1 and GT2 names from the 1994 and 1995 season. This season also mandated two-driver teams for all races. On November 17, the series held its first non-championship "All-Star Race" at Central Circuit.

The arrival of the McLaren F1 GTRs, prepared by Team Goh, was the biggest story of the 1996 season. The number 60 McLaren of Naoki Hattori and Ralf Schumacher led a 1-2 finish at the season opening round at Suzuka. However, despite winning three races, Hattori and Schumacher also suffered three retirements, and were beaten to the title by their senior teammates, Brabham and Nielsen. Despite massive performance handicaps instituted by the GTA, the two McLaren F1 GTRs combined to win four of the six championship races, and won pole position and set fastest lap in all six. At odds with the GTA over further performance handicaps that were to be proposed, Team Goh withdrew from the series after the championship finale at Miné Circuit, and after an aborted attempt to return in 2006, they would not return to the series until 2019.

The season also featured the debut of the Honda NSX in the series, although direct factory support would not appear until the following season; as such, the car entered by Team Kunimitsu was mostly mechanically identical to the 1995 24 Hours of Le Mans GT2 class winner.

Schedule

Season results

Point Ranking

GT500 Class

Drivers

GT300 Class (Top 5)

Drivers

External links
 Super GT/JGTC official race archive 
 1996 season results 

Super GT seasons
JGTC